Ram Singh Bishnoi was an Indian National Congress politician and senior leader from Rajasthan, India. He was an MLA from Luni constituency for seven times. His grandson Mahendra Bishnoi is currently an MLA from Luni.His son Malkhan singh Bishnoi was Former MLA from Luni and Paras ram Bishnoi was Pcc Member of Rajasthan Congress.

Personal life
Ram Singh Bishnoi was born in village Tilwasni, Bilara, Jodhpur. he was married to Amri devi Bishnoi. Former Luni MLA Malkhan Singh is his son Son paras ram bishnoi was pcc member from Rajasthan

See also
 Malkhan Singh BishnoiYUTUTU
 Mahendra Bishnoi
Luni VidhanSabha
Bishnoi Political Family

References 

Members of the Rajasthan Legislative Assembly
1951 births
2004 deaths
Indian National Congress politicians from Rajasthan